Sarzeh Kharuk (also Romanized as Sarzeh Khārūk; also known as Sarzeh and Sarzeh Bālā) is a village in Shamil Rural District, Takht District, Bandar Abbas County, Hormozgan Province, Iran. At the 2006 census, its population was 903, in 194 families.

References 

Populated places in Bandar Abbas County